Uturunqani (Aymara uturunqa, uturunqha, uturunqu, uturunqhu tiger (here referring to the jaguar), -ni a suffix to indicate ownership, "the one with the jaguar", Hispanicized spelling Otoronccani) is a mountain in the Andes of southern Peru, about  high. It is located in the Moquegua Region, General Sánchez Cerro Province, Ichuña District.

References

Mountains of Moquegua Region
Mountains of Peru